JSC Defense systems is a Russian-Belarusian air defense system manufacturer.

Overview
The company was formed on January 23, 1996 as a joint venture under a Russia-Belarus intergovernmental agreement. It consists of 38 subsidiaries in both countries. The company focuses on upgrading S-125 (SA-3) SAM systems to the modern Pechora-2M and Pechora-2A variants, and on the production of S-300PMU air defense systems.

In addition, JSC Defense Systems produces the Phoenix optronic round-scan target detection system, and the P-18 and Kama–N radars. The company also provides a wide range of services for foreign customers on maintenance and repair of ADMS means both in Russia and on the territory of the customer.

The company currently produces about 15-17 Pechora-2M systems each year. Some Russian media sources have reported that the portfolio of 2009-2011 export orders for Pechora-2M and Pechora-2A SAM systems totaled 200 units, including 70 for Egypt.

Missiles
 S-125 Neva/Pechora (SA-3 "Goa")

References

External links
Defense Systems company website

Defence companies of Russia
Manufacturing companies of Belarus
Manufacturing companies established in 1996
1996 establishments in Belarus
1996 establishments in Russia
Oboronprom
Belarus–Russia relations